James Price Point is a headland in the Kimberley region of Western Australia.

James Price Point was the proposed location of the Browse LNG gas terminal. The controversial proposal by Woodside Petroleum and its joint venture partners Royal Dutch Shell, BP, Mitsubishi Corporation and PetroChina divided the Broome community. It was opposed by the Goolarabooloo people and part of the community, supported by conservation groups Environs Kimberley, The Wilderness Society, ACF, WWF, Sea Shepherd and local organisations — Broome Community No Gas Campaign and Save the Kimberley. The Australian Greens also pushed for the protection of James Price Point. Support to protect the Kimberley coast was also provided by John Butler, Missy Higgins, Xavier Rudd, Jimmy Barnes, Rob Hirst, Paul Kelly and The Pigram Brothers.

The location is believed to be named after James Price, Minister for Works in Western Australia, who died in May 1910. It is possible that the place was named during this tour.

The name given by the Jabirr Jabirr and Goolarabooloo people is Walmadany.

The Aboriginal people recognise fossilised footprints on the coast as being the footprints of Marella, the Emu Man, a creator being from the Dreamtime.

A 2016 study of the footprints by the University of Queensland confirmed they are the largest collection of dinosaur footprints in the world and contain the world's largest single print. Indications of 21 separate dinosaur species from the Cretaceous period have been identified.

On 19 August 2013, the Supreme Court of Western Australia overruled Western Australian Environment Minister and the Western Australian Environmental Protection Authority's decision to recommend approval of the Browse LNG project at James Price Point after a legal challenge by Goolarabooloo custodian Richard Hunter and the Wilderness Society.

References

External links
 

Kimberley (Western Australia)
Headlands of Western Australia